In molecular biology, HOTTIP (HOXA transcript at the distal tip) is a long non-coding RNA. The gene encoding HOTTIP is located at the 5′ tip of the HOXA locus, and coordinates the activation of several of the 5′ HOXA genes. The non-coding RNA is brought into close proximity with the HOXA genes by chromosomal looping. HOTTIP binds to the WDR5 protein, which forms a complex with the histone methyltransferase protein MLL. This targets the WDR5-MLL complex to the HOXA region and results in H3K4 methylation and transcriptional activation of the HOXA locus.
More recently, HOTTIP has been shown to play a role in Hepatocellular Carcinoma (HCC) progression. HOTTIP expression levels predict metastasis formation and poor disease outcome in HCC patients.
 HOTTIP has been shown to be transcriptionally regulated by a transcriptional coactivator PSIP1/p52

See also
 Long noncoding RNA

References

Further reading
  

Non-coding RNA